All for You: A Dedication to the Nat King Cole Trio is the third studio album by Canadian singer Diana Krall, released on March 12, 1996, by Impulse! Records and GRP Records. The album pays tribute to the Nat King Cole Trio.

Track listing

Personnel
Credits adapted from the liner notes of All for You: A Dedication to the Nat King Cole Trio.

 Diana Krall – piano, lead vocals
 Russell Malone – guitar
 Paul Keller – bass
 Benny Green – piano on "If I Had You"
 Steve Kroon - percussion on "Boulevard of Broken Dreams"
 Tommy LiPuma – production
 Al Schmitt – recording, mixing
 Doug Sax – mastering
 Tom Tavee – photography
 Robin Lynch – graphic design, art direction
 Laurie Goldman – graphic design
 Terry Teachout – liner notes

Charts

Weekly charts

Year-end charts

Certifications

References

External links
 

1996 albums
Albums produced by Tommy LiPuma
Covers albums
Diana Krall albums
GRP Records albums
Impulse! Records albums
Justin Time Records albums
Nat King Cole tribute albums